Samuel Alexander  (6 January 1859 – 13 September 1938) was an Australian-born British philosopher. He was the first Jewish fellow of an Oxbridge college.

Early life
Alexander was born at 436 George Street, in what is now the commercial heart of Sydney, Australia. He was the third son of Samuel Alexander, a prosperous saddler, and Eliza née Sloman. Both parents were Jewish. His father died just before he was born, and Eliza moved to the adjacent colony of Victoria in 1863 or 1864. They went to live at St Kilda, and Alexander was placed at a private school kept by a Mr Atkinson.

In 1871, he was sent to Wesley College, Melbourne, then under the headmastership of Martin Howy Irving, and was always grateful for the efficiency and comprehensiveness of his schooling. He matriculated at the University of Melbourne on 22 March 1875 to do arts. He was placed in the first class in both his first and second years, was awarded the classical and mathematical exhibitions (top of year) in his first year. In his second year, he won the exhibitions in Greek; Latin and English; mathematics and natural philosophy; and natural science.

England
In May 1877, Alexander left for England in an attempt to win a scholarship, arriving at the end of August. He was initially undecided whether to go to Oxford or Cambridge, but he chose Oxford and sat for a scholarship at Balliol College. Among the competition were George Curzon and J. W. Mackail. Though his tutor thought little of his chances, Alexander achieved second place after Mackail and gained a scholarship.

At Oxford, he obtained a first class in classical and mathematical moderations, a rare achievement, and a first class in literae humaniores, his final examination for the degree of BA, in 1881. Two of his tutors were the philosopher T. H. Green and the Latinist Henry Nettleship, who exercised a great influence on his early work.

Work and publications
After taking his degree, Alexander was made a fellow of Lincoln College, where he remained as philosophy tutor from 1882 to 1893. It was during this period that he developed his interest in psychology, then a neglected subject. In 1887, he won the Green moral philosophy prize with an essay on the subject "In what direction does Moral Philosophy seem to you to admit or require advance?" This was the basis of his volume Moral Order and Progress, which was published in 1889 and went into its third edition in 1899.

By 1912, however, Alexander had altered his views to some extent and considered that the book had served its purpose and had become dated. During the period of his fellowship at Lincoln, he contributed articles on philosophical subjects to Mind, the Proceedings of the Aristotelian Society, and the International Journal of Ethics. He did some travelling on the continent, and in the winter of 1890–91 was in Germany working at the psychological laboratory of Hugo Münsterberg at Freiburg. Among his colleagues at Lincoln was Walter Baldwin Spencer.

For some time, Alexander had wanted to obtain a professorship. He made three unsuccessful attempts before he was appointed at the Owens College, Manchester in 1893, remaining there for the rest of his life. There, he quickly became a leading figure in the university. Among his colleagues there was the educational theorist Catherine Isabella Dodd. Unconventional in his attire and his manner of conducting his classes, there was something in him that drew students and colleagues alike to him. He wrote little, and his growing deafness made it difficult for him to get much out of philosophical discussions, though he could manage conversation.

An important change in his home life occurred in 1902 when the whole of his family – his mother, an aunt, two elder brothers and his sister – came from Australia to live with him. It worked well in Alexander's case. His sister became a most efficient hostess and on Wednesday evenings fellow members of the staff, former pupils, a few advanced students and others would drop in. His home at that time was at 6 Mauldeth Road West in Withington (from 1904 in the City of Manchester).

Alexander was the "unofficial godfather" of writer Naomi Mitchison, born in 1897 – and as she noted, he took this far more seriously than many who have such a position officially. From an early age he took an interest in her studies and her intellectual and literary development, and often wrote her long and detailed letters offering useful advice. Mitchison devoted a chapter in her autobiographical work You may well ask to Alexander, recounting with great warmth and affection various anecdotes of her contact with him over several decades until his death and quoting extensively from letters that he wrote her. The chapter in Mitchison's book devoted to Alexander is called "Beauty and the Bicycle", a reference to the bicycle which was Alexander's preferred means of locomotion - a familiar sight in the streets of Manchester at the time.

He was given the Hon. LLD of St Andrews in 1905, and in later years he received Hon. Litt. D. degrees from Durham, Liverpool, Oxford and Cambridge. In 1908, he published Locke, a short but excellent study, which was included in the Philosophies Ancient and Modern Series. He was president of the Aristotelian Society from 1908 to 1911 and from 1936 to 1937. In 1913, was made a fellow of the British Academy. He was appointed Gifford lecturer at Glasgow in 1915, and delivered his lectures in the winters of 1917 and 1918. These he developed into his great work Space, Time, and Deity, published in two volumes in 1920, which his biographer has called the "boldest adventure in detailed speculative metaphysics attempted in so grand a manner by any English writer between 1655 and 1920".  That its conclusions should be universally accepted was scarcely to be expected, but it was widely and well reviewed, and made a great impression on philosophic thinkers at the time and for many years after. His Arthur Davis Memorial Lecture on Spinoza and Time was published in 1921, and in 1924 Alexander retired from his chair.

Though Alexander kept his Manchester professorship until retirement, "He tried, on several occasions, to return to Oxford as a professor, but (I am as good as certain) never thought of leaving 'dear sooty Manchester' for any place other than Oxford." The Public Orator of Oxford, Arthur Blackburne, took rather a condescending view of Manchester and commended Alexander for his civilizing activities in the city: Et quid est gratius quam ea studia quae praecipue nostra sunt eo quoque pervenire ubi plerique se negotiis potius quam Musis deditos esse profitentur?. This translates as: "'And what is more pleasant than that those studies, which are especially ours, should also reach that area [region, point] where the majority confess themselves to be devoted to business rather than the Arts?"

Semi-retirement
Before he retired, Alexander had longed for leisure, but it was impossible for him to be idle. He continued to give short courses and single lectures in connection with the extramural department, he graded examinations for higher degrees and also did some reviewing. He retained until 1930 the office of presenter for honorary degrees. His short orations when presenting were models of grace and skill. He remained on many committees, always ready to give them the benefit of his help and wisdom. Alexander kept up his interest in the British Academy and the British Institute of Philosophy, as well as in Jewish communities in England and Palestine.

Honours
In 1925, he was honoured by the presentation of his bust by Jacob Epstein to the University of Manchester, where it was placed in the centre of the hall of the arts building, which is named after him. He was Herbert Spencer lecturer at Oxford in 1927, and in 1930 the Order of Merit was conferred on him, the first to an Australian-born.

In 1933, he published Beauty and Other Forms of Value, mainly an essay in aesthetics, which incorporated passages from papers that had appeared in the previous ten years. Some of the earlier parts of the book were deliberately meant to be provocative, and Alexander had hoped that artists of distinction in various mediums might be tempted to say how they worked. He had, however, not reckoned with the difficulty most artists find in explaining their methods of work and the response was comparatively meagre.

Death and legacy

He was greatly troubled by the sufferings of the Jews in Europe and gave much of his time and money in helping to alleviate them.

Early in 1938, he realised that his end was approaching and he died on 13 September 1938. He was unmarried and his ashes lie in Manchester Southern cemetery (British Jewish Reform Congregation section).

His will was proved at about £16,000, of which £1,000 went to the University of Jerusalem and the bulk of the remainder to the University of Manchester. In 1939, his Philosophical and Literary Pieces was published with a memoir by his literary executor, John Laird. This volume included papers on literary subjects, as well as philosophical lectures, several of which had been published separately.

When lecturing, Alexander could be quite informal, at times dropping into a kind of conversation with his class, and would follow a side track if it looked promising. He did not always give the impression that he was much interested in teaching, yet he was a great teacher whose influence was widespread. He was one of the greatest speculative thinkers of his time.

A theatre at Monash University, Melbourne, is named for him and a cast of his bust by Epstein stands in its foyer.

The building formerly known as Humanities Lime Grove at the University of Manchester was renamed the Samuel Alexander Building in 2007. It was given Grade II listed building status by English Heritage on 12 February 2010. As in Melbourne, a cast of his bust by Epstein stands in its foyer.

Philosophical ideas
Two key concepts for Alexander are those of an "emergent quality" and the idea of emergent evolution:

His task, as in any metaphysical theory, was to account for every aspect of existing reality in the simplest and most economical basis. Alexander's idea was to start with space and time, each of which he regarded as inconceivable without the other, in fact mutually equivalent. Out of this, pure spacetime emerges, through a process Alexander describes simply as "motion", the stuff and matter that make up our material world:

Alexander absolutizes spacetime, and even speaks of it as a "Entity|stuff" of which things are made. At the same time he also says that spacetime can be called "Motions" – not motion in the singular, but complexes of motions with kaleidoscopic changes within a continuum. So one might say that for Alexander motion is primitive, and space and time are defined through relations between motions.

In Space, Time, and Deity Alexander held that an object may be before a consciousness, but is not in it; consciousness of an object is not the same as consciousness of one's consciousness of the object. For example, an object such as a chair may be apprehended by a consciousness, but the chair is not located within that consciousness; and, the contemplation of the chair is distinct from thinking about the act of contemplating the chair. Further, since the contemplation of an object is itself an action, in Alexander's view it cannot be "contemplated", but only subjectively experienced, or "enjoyed".

Alexander asked the question:

 

Alexander was a contemporary of A. N. Whitehead, whom he influenced, and mentored others who went on to become major figures in 20th-century British philosophy.

R. G. Collingwood contended Alexander to be a "philosophical genius of very high order".

His views have been described as panentheistic.

Books
Moral Order and Progress (1889)
Locke (1908)
Space, Time, and Deity (1920), Macmillan & Co., reprinted 1966 by Dover Publications, reprinted 2004 by Kessinger Publications: "volume one" :  online version, "volume two" : 
Spinoza and Time (1921)
Art and the Material (1925); Adamson Lecture for 1925
Beauty and Other Forms of Value (1933)
Philosophical and Literary Pieces (1939), (posthumous)

Notes

References

External links 
Gifford Lectures biography
Samuel Alexander article by Emily Thomas in Internet Encyclopedia of Philosophy originally published 28 May 2012   
John Slater's Introduction to the Collected Works of Samuel Alexander has some biographical details on Alexander's life.
Samuel Alexander papers at the University of Manchester Library
Article by recent occupier of Alexander's chair at the University of Manchester discussing the legacy of Whitehead and Alexander.
"Samuel Alexander and Zionism"

1859 births
1938 deaths
19th-century British male writers
19th-century British philosophers
19th-century educational theorists
19th-century educators
19th-century essayists
19th-century scholars
20th-century British male writers
20th-century British writers
20th-century British philosophers
20th-century educational theorists
20th-century educators
20th-century essayists
Academics of the Victoria University of Manchester
Action theorists
Alumni of Balliol College, Oxford
Aristotelian philosophers
Australian Jews
Australian members of the Order of Merit
British educational theorists
British ethicists
British male essayists
British philosophers
British consciousness researchers and theorists
Epistemologists
Fellows of Lincoln College, Oxford
Fellows of the British Academy
Idealists
Jewish educators
Jewish ethicists
Jewish philosophers
Locke scholars
Metaphilosophers
Ontologists
Panentheists
People educated at Wesley College (Victoria)
People from Sydney
Philosophical cosmologists
Philosophers of art
Philosophers of education
Philosophers of identity
Philosophers of literature
Philosophers of mathematics
Philosophers of mind
Philosophers of psychology
Philosophers of science
Philosophers of time
Presidents of the Aristotelian Society
Spinoza scholars
Spinozists
University of Melbourne alumni
Writers about religion and science
Writers from Sydney